Learning to Drive is a 2014 American comedy drama film. Directed by Isabel Coixet and written by Sarah Kernochan based on a New Yorker article by Katha Pollitt, the film stars Patricia Clarkson as Wendy, a successful book critic taking driving lessons with instructor Darwan (Ben Kingsley) after the breakup of her marriage to Ted (Jake Weber) forces her to become more self-sufficient. This is the second collaboration between Ben Kingsley, Patricia Clarkson, and Isabel Coixet.

The film was named first-runner up for the People's Choice Award at the 2014 Toronto International Film Festival. The film was released on August 21, 2015.

Plot summary
Wendy (Patricia Clarkson) is a known book critic, who has just  broken up with her husband, Ted (Jake Weber), during an argument in a bar. Her husband leaves the scene and calls a taxi that is driven by Darwan (Ben Kingsley), who is also an Indian Sikh. When Wendy suddenly jumps in the car, Darwan experiences their anger and heated exchange. The husband has enough of the accusations and sends Wendy home alone in the taxi, so Darwan also witnesses her sadness and regret.

Wendy has never needed to drive in New York, but now she needs to learn, in order to visit her daughter Tasha (Grace Gummer) who is living and working on a commune farm in Vermont. Through a series of events, Wendy becomes Darwan's driving student, developing a close friendship in the process, as he is an intellectual and was a teacher back in India.

Wendy fails her license driving test on her first attempt and decides to stop trying. Tasha tells her that she has decided not to return to the farm and wants to live with her mother instead, even though it is a requirement for her college education. She also admits that she is in love with a student who was at the farm with her, and that he was going back to the college campus. Wendy tells her daughter that she must finish her farming experience and that she will figure out a way to visit her daughter.

Darwan goes through an arranged marriage to Jasleen (Sarita Choudhury), but the marriage is not going well, as they don’t seem to have any common interests. Darwan confides in Wendy that his marriage is having problems and Wendy asks him if he would ever cheat on Jasleen if she disappointed him. He replies with a definitive no and she tells him: “you are a good man.”

Wendy passes her next license driving test and Darwan helps her buy a new car. As they are saying their goodbyes, Darwan asks Wendy if they can meet in the future, but Wendy declines, telling him: "the trouble is, you’re a good man."

Later that night, Jasleen comes home from shopping to find Darwan sitting on their bed. She sits next to him having no idea what to expect, when he asks: "Jasleen, maybe I will not work at night anymore. Would you like that?" She smiles with a sense of relief and he puts his hand on her face and his head on her shoulder, the pair both looking happy for the first time since their wedding day.

The last scene shows Wendy driving out of New York in her new car, traveling alone to visit her daughter.

Cast
 Patricia Clarkson as Wendy Shields
 Ben Kingsley as Darwan Singh Tur
 Grace Gummer as Tasha
 Jake Weber as Ted
 Sarita Choudhury as Jasleen
 John Hodgman as Car Salesman
 Samantha Bee as Debbie
 Matt Salinger as Peter
 Daniela Lavender as Mata
 Michael Mantell as Wendy's Father
 Avi Nash as Preet
 Bryan Burton as Student Driver
 Nora Hummel as Driving Examiner

Reception
On Rotten Tomatoes the film has an approval rating of 66% based on reviews from 56 critics, with an average 6.3/10. The site's consensus states: "The story's a bit predictable, but Learning to Drive is elevated by typically strong work from stars Patricia Clarkson and Ben Kingsley." On Metacritic, the film has a score of 59 out of 100, based on reviews from 23 critics, indicating "mixed or average reviews".

References

External links

Learning to Drive, Katha Pollitt, The New Yorker, July 22, 2002

2014 romantic comedy-drama films
Films directed by Isabel Coixet
Broad Green Pictures films
Films about race and ethnicity
American romantic comedy-drama films
Films set in New York (state)
2014 comedy films
2014 drama films
2010s English-language films
2010s American films